This is a list of singles which have reached number one on the Irish Singles Chart in 1983.

22 Number Ones
Most weeks at No. 1 (song): "Words" - F. R. David (5)
Most weeks at No. 1 (artist): The Police (7)
Most No. 1s: The Police, Paul Young (2 each)

See also
1983 in music
Irish Singles Chart
List of artists who reached number one in Ireland

1983 in Irish music
1983 record charts
1983